Vince Heflin (born July 7, 1959) is a former professional American football wide receiver. He played for five seasons in the National Football League (NFL) for the Tampa Bay Buccaneers and Miami Dolphins. Heflin attended Wayne High School in Huber Heights, Ohio and played college football at Central State University.

He is the brother of former NFL defensive back Victor Heflin.

References

1959 births
Living people
Players of American football from Dayton, Ohio
People from Huber Heights, Ohio
American football wide receivers
Central State Marauders football players
Miami Dolphins players
Tampa Bay Buccaneers players